The Lover of Camille is a 1924 American silent romantic drama film directed by Harry Beaumont, and starring Monte Blue. The film was based on the French play Deburau by Sacha Guitry, which was also adapted into a Broadway play by Harley Granville-Barker.

Plot
As described in a review in a film magazine, Jean Gaspard Deburau (Blue), the clown of a pantomime theatre in Paris, is the idol of the populace. In a box is an attractive woman who waits for him after the show. Immediately he falls in love with her. After a time he return to find his own wife has left him for his friend Robillard (Lewis). To the woman, Marie (Prevost), Deburau’s love has been but a passing thing, and returning to her he finds her in the arms of a wealthy fellow, Armand (Miller). Disillusioned, he quits the stage, finding a little happiness in his son Charles. Years pass, Deburau clings to the idea Marie will return, and finally she does, broken in health, telling him Armand has left her. She pleads that he return to the stage, 111 °F with fever, she becomes delirious and Deburau marries her while she thinks he is Armand. At the first performance he breaks down because of his sorrow, and Marie dies. Hiding his broken heart, he dresses his son as the clown and finds some happiness in seeing him acclaimed by the populace.

Cast

Preservation
A print of The Lover of Camille is preserved at the Filmarchiv Austria (Wien).

References

External links

1924 films
1924 romantic drama films
1920s biographical drama films
American romantic drama films
American biographical drama films
American silent feature films
American black-and-white films
Films based on works by Sacha Guitry
Films directed by Harry Beaumont
Warner Bros. films
American films based on plays
Biographical films about actors
Films set in the 1840s
Films set in Paris
1920s American films
Silent romantic drama films
Silent American drama films